NHK is the Japanese public broadcasting corporation.

NHK may also refer to:

 NHK Party, a Japanese political party that abbreviates itself as "NHK". 
 NHK Trophy, a figure skating competition jointly held by NHK and Japan Skating Federation
 NHK Spring Company
 Welcome to the N.H.K., a Japanese novel later adapted into a manga and anime series
 Nathan Homer Knorr (April 23, 1905 – June 8, 1977), third president of the Watch Tower Bible and Tract Society of Pennsylvania (Jehovah's Witnesses)
 The Dutch Reformed Church (Nederlandse Hervormde Kerk)
 The Nederduitsch Hervormde Kerk van Afrika, a Dutch Reformed denomination in Southern Africa
 Naval Air Station Patuxent River (IATA and FAA code NHK)
 Nucleosomal histone kinase, a protein
 Nozaki–Hiyama–Kishi reaction, a coupling reaction used in organic synthesis
 Kouhei Matsunaga, a Japanese musician also known as NHK yx Koyxen